Selina Goddard (sometimes called Selina Smith; born 23 July 1994) is a New Zealand international lawn bowls player, playing out of Takapuna Bowling Club.

Bowls career
Goddard was introduced to the sport at a young age through her parents, who were keen bowlers. She started playing bowls competitively at age 14, while attending Howick College in eastern Auckland. , she is based in Auckland, New Zealand.

Goddard has been a part of numerous annual Trans-Tasman series. In 2013 she was first introduced to the New Zealand Under 18 Bowls Team. In 2014, she was then selected to play in the New Zealand Development Team for the annual Trans-Tasman match, where the ladies development team won series. At the 2016 Trans-Tasman in Christchurch, New Zealand she was a part of the winning open women's side. At the 2017 Trans-Tasman on the Gold Coast, Queensland, she was selected to be a part of the series.

She competed at the 2014 Commonwealth Games as part of the women's triples and women's fours teams. She won a bronze medal in the women's fours events alongside teammates Mandy Boyd, Amy McIlroy and Val Smith.

Selina has won four national titles. The first at the 2014 New Zealand National Bowls Championships in Dunedin, where alongside teammates Mandy Boyd, Amy Mcilroy and Gemma Watts they won the fours. Then at the 2017 National Open Championships in Taranaki, she won the singles which entered her into the 2017 World Singles Champion of Champions, held at St John Park Bowling Club in Sydney, Australia and where she won a bronze medal. The third and fourth National titles came in 2020 when she won the pairs with Katelyn Inch and the fours under her married name.

In 2022, she competed in the women's pairs and the Women's fours at the 2022 Commonwealth Games. In the pairs and fours she secured a bronze medal.

References

External links
 Selina Goddard at Bowls New Zealand (archived)
 
 
 
 

1994 births
Living people
New Zealand female bowls players
Commonwealth Games bronze medallists for New Zealand
Commonwealth Games medallists in lawn bowls
Bowls players at the 2014 Commonwealth Games
Bowls players at the 2022 Commonwealth Games
People educated at Howick College
Medallists at the 2014 Commonwealth Games
Medallists at the 2022 Commonwealth Games